Methylobacterium gregans  is a Gram-negative, strictly aerobic, facultatively methylotrophic and non-spore-forming bacteria from the genus of Methylobacterium which has been isolated from water samples from food factories in Japan.

References

Further reading

External links
Type strain of Methylobacterium gregans at BacDive -  the Bacterial Diversity Metadatabase

Hyphomicrobiales
Bacteria described in 2008